Jean Albert "Schang" Hutter (11 August 1934 – 14 June 2021) was a Swiss sculptor.

Biography
From 1950 to 1954, Hutter worked for his father as an apprentice stonemason and attended the Kunstgewerbeschule in Bern. In 1954, he moved to Munich and studied under Charles Crodel and Josef Henselmann at the Academy of Fine Arts, Munich until 1961, when he moved back to Switzerland for Küttigkofen.

On 28 February 1998, he installed a sculpture honoring the victims of the Holocaust at the Federal Palace of Switzerland as part of the 200th anniversary of the Helvetic Republic. However, it was placed three meters away from the originally agreed location and was removed four days later following a complaint from the Freedom Party of Switzerland.

Hutter spent his later years in Genoa. In celebration of his 80th birthday, a special exhibition was held at the Tramdepot Burgernziel in Bern in 2014.

Schang Hutter died in Solothurn on 14 June 2021 at the age of 86.

References

1934 births
2021 deaths
Academy of Fine Arts, Munich alumni
People from Solothurn
Artists from Genoa
20th-century Swiss sculptors
21st-century Swiss sculptors